Kipawa may refer to:

Canada 
 Kipawa, Quebec, a village and municipality in western Quebec, Canada, in the Témiscamingue Regional County Municipality
 Lake Kipawa, a lake in far south-west Quebec, Canada
 Kipawa River, is a short river in western Quebec, Canada
 2000 Kipawa earthquake, strucked Quebec and Ontario, Canada in 2000
 Zec de Kipawa, a "zone d'exploitation contrôlée" located in the unorganized territory Les Lacs-du-Témiscamingue, in the Témiscamingue Regional County Municipality, in the administrative region of Abitibi-Témiscamingue, in Quebec, in Canada

Other uses 
 Kipawa (Tanzanian ward),  an administrative ward in the Ilala District of the Dar es Salaam Region of Tanzania